Irishtown is a locality in the Wheatbelt region of Western Australia near Northam.

References

Irishtown